Leprosy is the second studio album by American death metal band Death, released on August 12, 1988, by Combat Records. The album is notable in its different tone and quality from the band's 1987 debut, it is the first example of Scott Burns' work heard on many of the death metal and grindcore albums of that era. The cover is featured in Metal: A Headbanger's Journey. It is the first album to feature drummer Bill Andrews and the only to feature guitarist Rick Rozz.

In a poll by the German Rock Hard magazine, Leprosy was voted the number one of the 25 most important death metal albums of all time. On April 29, 2014, a three-disc remastered edition containing bonus tracks was released via Relapse Records.

The title track was covered by the blackened death metal band Akercocke on their 2007 album Antichrist. Dutch melodic death metal band Callenish Circle covered "Pull the Plug" as a bonus on their Flesh Power Dominion album, released in 2002; shortly thereafter, Norwegian band Zyklon also recorded "Pull the Plug" to be used as a bonus track. Finnish thrash metal band Mokoma covered the track "Open Casket", with lyrics in Finnish and titled "Avoin Hauta", on their EP Viides Vuodenaika. "Pull the Plug" was also covered by American band Revocation.

Track listing
All music written by Chuck Schuldiner and Rick Rozz, unless stated. All lyrics written by Chuck Schuldiner. All songs published by Mutilation Music.

Personnel

Death 
 Chuck Schuldiner – vocals, rhythm and lead guitar, bass
 Rick Rozz – lead guitar
 Bill Andrews – drums
 Terry Butler – credited with bass but did not play on the album

Production 
 Dan Johnson – production
 Scott Burns – engineering
 Michael Fuller – mastering
 Edward Repka – artwork
 Eric Greif – management
 Frank White – photography
 David Bett – art direction
 Alan Douches – mastering (2014 reissue)

References

External links
Lyrics to every track on Deaths official website

1988 albums
Death (metal band) albums
Combat Records albums
Relapse Records albums
Dystopian music
Albums recorded at Morrisound Recording
Albums with cover art by Ed Repka